Balalaika is a 1939 American musical romance film based on the 1936 London stage musical of the same name. Produced by Lawrence Weingarten and directed by Reinhold Schunzel, it starred Nelson Eddy and Ilona Massey.

The film follows the romance of Prince Peter Karagin and Lydia Pavlovna Marakova, a singer and secret revolutionary, in Imperial Russia on the eve of World War I. Douglas Shearer was nominated for the 1939 Academy Award for Best Sound Recording.

Plot
In 1914 Tsarist Russia, Prince Peter Karagin (Nelson Eddy) is a captain of the Cossack Guards, riding home from manoeuvres to an evening of wine, women and song at St. Petersburg's Cafe Balalaika. The Balalaika's new star, Lydia Pavlovna Marakova (Ilona Massey), is blackmailed into attending the officers' party and is expected to choose a "favoured one." She intrigues Karagin when she makes good her escape instead.

Masquerading as a poor music student, Karagin insinuating himself into Lydia's family and circle of musician friends, unaware that they are dedicated revolutionaries. He discovers his larcenous orderly, Nikki Poppov (Charlie Ruggles), courting the Marakovs' maid, Masha (Joyce Compton). Karagin then bullies Ivan Danchenoff (Frank Morgan), Director of the Imperial Opera, into giving Lydia an audition; Danchenoff is pleasantly surprised to find that (unlike the 60 other women foisted on him by other aristocrats) she has real talent. Later, Karagin orders his usual arrangements for seduction, but falls in love instead and tries to cancel them. She understands both his former and current motives, and admits she loves him too.

Their happiness ends when Lydia's brother Dimitri (Dalies Frantz) is killed after giving a seditious speech on the street by Cossacks led by Peter, whom Lydia recognizes. When she learns that her opera debut will be used as an opportunity to assassinate Peter and his father the general (C. Aubrey Smith), she makes Peter promise not to come or let his father come to the performance, pretending she would be too nervous with them watching. The two men attend anyway. Fortunately, General Karagin receives a message that Germany has declared war on Russia and announces it to the crowd. Professor Makarov (Lionel Atwill), Lydia's father, decides not to shoot because the general will be needed to defend Mother Russia. However, Leo Proplinski (Abner Biberman) feels otherwise, grabs the pistol and shoots the general, though not fatally. Peter finally learns of Lydia's political beliefs when she is arrested. Later, he has her released.

Peter goes to fight as an officer in the trenches. When the Russian Revolution overthrows the old regime, he winds up in 1920s Paris employed by his former orderly as a cabaret entertainer at the new "Balalaika". To celebrate the Russian Orthodox New Year, White Russians, wearing court dress and paste jewels, gather as Poppov's guests. When Poppov makes Peter stand before a mirror, candle in hand, to make the traditional New Year's wish to see his "true love," Lydia appears behind him.

Cast

 Nelson Eddy as Prince Peter Karagin, aka "Peter Illyich Teranda"
 Ilona Massey as Lydia Pavlovna Marakova
 Charlie Ruggles as Corporal Nicki Popoff
 Frank Morgan as Ivan Danchenoff
 Lionel Atwill as Prof. Pavel Marakov
 C. Aubrey Smith as Gen. Karagin
 Joyce Compton as Masha, the Marakovs' maid and later Nicki's wife
 Dalies Frantz as Dimitri Marakov
 Walter Woolf King as Capt. Michael Sibirsky, Peter's friend
 Abner Biberman as Leo Proplinski
 Arthur W. Cernitz as Capt. Sergei Pavloff
 Roland Varno as Lt. Nikitin
 George Tobias as Slaski (bartender)
 Phillip Terry as Lt. Smirnoff
 Frederick Worlock as Ramensky
 Roland Varno as Lt. Nikitin
 Paul Sutton as Anton (waiter)
 Willy Castello as Capt. Testoff
 Paul Irving as Prince Morodin
 Mildred Shay as Jeanette Sibirsky
 Alma Kruger as Mrs. Danchenoff
 Zeffie Tilbury as Princess Natalya Petrovna

Among the uncredited cast are: 
 Maurice Cass
 Feodor Chaliapin Jr., son of the famous Russian operatic bass, as Soldier
 Al Ferguson as Soldier
 Jack George as Violinist
 Charles Judels as Batoff
 Michael Mark
 Paul Newlan as Policeman
 Irra Petina
 Lee Phelps as Doorman
 Frank Puglia as Ivan (Troika Inn owner)
 Hector Sarno
 Harry Semels
 Florence Shirley as Lily Allison (Paris tourist)
 Ellinor Vanderveer

Musical score
Only the musical's title song, "At the Balalaika," with altered lyrics, was used in the film. MGM had music director Herbert Stothart adapt material it already owned or was otherwise available, or write original material as needed.

List of musical numbers in order of appearance:

A number of additional songs were copyrighted for the film, but apparently not used.

Production notes
Various sources agree that MGM was planning to make this film two years before production actually began. Filming started in June 1939, although Eddy and Massey spent the four weeks prior to shooting pre-recording their musical numbers.

Miliza Korjus was offered the role of Lydia but "thought it was a joke."  She turned it down on the assumption Eddy would again be teamed with Jeanette MacDonald, apparently unaware that both Eddy and MacDonald were demanding solo star roles from the studio, or that the studio had agreed. She was devastated to learned that Ilona Massey had accepted the role, losing the opportunity to work with "that gorgeous hunk of baritone".

Censorship
Like all films of the era, Balalaika was subject to censorship by the Production Code Administration. Beginning with a December 1937 letter to Louis B. Mayer, Joseph Breen opened with a suggestion that the film not offend "...the citizens or government of any country..." before detailing what could not appear in the film: a prostitute, sale or discussion of pornography, all risque dialog, and reference to a male secretary as a "pansy".  In addition "... mob violence... must avoid... details of brutality and gruesomeness." Notwithstanding, the audience had plenty of clues to fill in the blanks.

Critical reception
Previewed on December 15, 1938, most critics agreed that the stars and production were excellent, even if the script and plot were not. Many went on to prophesy a glowing career for Massey – here in her first starring role – which never took off. Frank S. Nugent's review in The New York Times praised Massey's blond good looks and Eddy's competence: "She looks like Dietrich, talks like Garbo... while leaving the bulk of (the score) safely to Mr. Eddy..."

Despite enjoying the romantic escapism and musical artistry, Nugent foresaw international repercussions. "In these propaganda-searching days, we know the comrades are going to howl bloody Metro-Goldwyn-Mayer. The notion of peasant girls tossing their locks and eyes at the Imperial Guard and the film's gusty sighing over the dear dead days... are bound to be tantamount to waving a papal bull before the Red flag of The Daily Worker."

Nor did he overlook the film's shortcomings, "...the picture is long on formula and short on originality... nine out of ten sequences have been blue-printed before," but nonetheless gave director Reinhold Schunzel credit for a job well done.

References

External links

 
 
 

1939 films
1930s romantic musical films
American romantic musical films
American black-and-white films
American films based on plays
Films directed by Reinhold Schünzel
Films scored by Herbert Stothart
Films set in 1914
Films set in 1917
Films set in the 1920s
Films set in Paris
Films set in Russia
Metro-Goldwyn-Mayer films
Russian Revolution films
1930s English-language films
1930s American films